Vadim Salcutan (born July 21, 1973) is a Moldovan sprint canoer who competed in the mid-1990s. He was eliminated in the semifinals of the C-1 1000 m event at the 1996 Summer Olympics in Atlanta.

References
Sports-Reference.com profile

External links

1973 births
Canoeists at the 1996 Summer Olympics
Living people
Moldovan male canoeists
Olympic canoeists of Moldova
Place of birth missing (living people)